Obsidian (Todd James Rice) is a superhero published by DC Comics. He first appeared in All-Star Squadron #25 (September 1983), and was created by Roy Thomas and Jerry Ordway. He is the son of Alan Scott and Rose Canton and the twin brother of Jade. According to an Infinity, Inc. letter page, Obsidian was named "Todd" after a friend of Thomas.

Obsidian made his first live-action appearance on the second season of the DC show Legends of Tomorrow, with a younger version of the character portrayed by Dan Payne, with no speaking lines, and an older version portrayed by Lance Henriksen. Rice also appears in the third season of Stargirl on The CW network played by Tim Gabriel.

Fictional character biography
Obsidian is the codename of Todd Rice, who is the biological son of Alan Scott and Rose Canton, respectively the Golden Age superhero Green Lantern and villain Thorn. Todd was raised in an abusive adoptive home in Milwaukee, Wisconsin. He finds out in his late teens that he has a twin sister, Jennie-Lynn Hayden, alias Jade. The two meet, discover they both have superpowers and decide to follow in Alan Scott's footsteps and become heroes. The duo begin to operate under the assumption that Scott is their father. Although not certain of this lineage at first, the two eventually learn for certain that they are indeed Green Lantern's children.

As Obsidian and Jade, the two were founding members of the superhero team Infinity, Inc., a group composed mainly of the children, grandchildren and protégés of members of the Justice Society of America.

Post-Crisis (1987–2011)
Obsidian also serves with the Justice League in their satilite-based space station headquarters. Obsidian has many various adventures at the headquarters, including helping the League deal with dozens of aliens who are the last surviving members of their species. During his tenure with the League, Rice undergoes therapy and also has to deal with seemingly permanent injuries to his shadow form.

Obsidian apparently inherited a potential for mental illness from his mother, Thorn.  Corrupted by Ian Karkull, Obsidian turned evil, using his shadow powers to first steal all the shadows from an entire city before spreading darkness over the entire world. During this time as a villain Rice attacks his foster father. Ultimately, his biological father Alan Scott, fighting as Green Lantern and with the aid of other JSA members, defeats him. Obsidian retreats to the Shadowlands, the otherdimensional plane from which he derives his powers. Obsidian later joins the mystical villains Mordru and Eclipso in an unsuccessful attempt to get revenge on Green Lantern and the JSA. Following this defeat by the heroes of the JSA, Obsidian is cured of his mental imbalance.

After being cured, Obsidan retired and he came out and came to terms with his self-identity as a gay man. Rice meets and falls in love with Damon Matthews, an assistant district attorney who works with Kate Spencer, aka the vigilante Manhunter. Todd's powers go dormant for some time but they return following the death of his twin sister Jade during Infinite Crisis. Obsidian returns to being a superhero and continues to happily date Damon.

Obsidian appears during the year-long 52 event. Watching a Thanksgiving Day Parade, he sees Luthor's personally engineered 'Everyman' superhero team going by. Enraged that one of the members is nicknamed 'Jade', he angrily confronts the group, endangering innocent people in the process. The Everyman heroes protect the crowd and Obsidian is talked out of doing anything drastic.

Prior to the events of Justice Society of America (vol. 3) #1, Obsidian joins the JSA and serves as the security guard of their New York headquarters.

Obsidian later degenerates into an egg consisting purely of darkness. It is later revealed that this state was caused by an attack by Kid Karnevil, who gave Obsidian to a shadowy female villain. In Justice Society of America (vol. 3) #37, Obsidian re-appears as a power source for the Darkness Engine, causing all super-powered beings on earth to lose their powers. After Mister Terrific manages to travel back in time, he tells the others that they must hatch the Obsidian egg or they will all die and Obsidian's father agrees that this must happen. Able to now use this information to change events, while Kid Karnevil is looking for the black egg in the ruins of the JSA Brownstone, he is confronted by the restored Obsidian, who takes him out and rejoins his teammates in the combat against the villains.

Brightest Day
Obsidian and the JSA come into contact with Batman's new Justice League after Alan Scott is possessed by an unknown entity and takes off into the sky. After catching up with Scott and reuniting with Jade (who had been resurrected in the closing moments of Blackest Night), the teams figure out that the being controlling Scott is the Starheart, the cosmic force that granted Scott and his children their abilities. The Starheart then takes over Obsidian's body as well and disappears with him. When the JSA members try to visit the shadow-wielding immortal known as the Shade in hopes of getting him to track down their missing teammates, they find a crazed Obsidian and Doctor Fate standing over Shade's comatose body. Before the others can call for reinforcements, Obsidian and Fate knock them unconscious and capture them.

At one unspecified point Obsidian's twin sister, Jade, is contacted by the Entity, who tells her to help him to "balance the darkness" and save their friends from  what appears to be the villain Eclipso.

Jade tried to rescue her brother from the Starheart's control, but both brother and sister fused together and formed a hybrid with the powers of both Jade and Obsidian, all the while in the Starheart's control. Together, the siblings attacked the Justice League and the Justice Society until Jade is contacted by the Entity. Jade resisted the Starheart's control and tried to balance the darkness inside of both of them. Jade and Obsidian are eventually separated by the Entity so Jade could complete her task, however Obsidian became paranoid and tried to force Jade to fuse once again with him. Jade managed to prevent the fusion but Obsidian was restrained by Kyle in a green bubble and taken far away from Jade. Jade managed to restore her father's Starheart, which was revealed to be the unidentified threat. In the end Jade is reunited with her father who returns to normal but she cannot approach her brother or vice versa or both of them would eventually fuse once again into the hybrid and risk releasing the Starheart.

The New 52: Earth 2: World's End and Convergence (2011–2016)
Following DC's The New 52 company-wide reboot in 2011, Alan Scott and his family no longer appeared in stories featured in DC's main continuity. In Earth-2, one of the fifty-two divergent realities branching from the core New Earth reality, Alan Scott is a gay man without children. In Earth-2: World's End, a different version of Todd Rice appears who is Black, bald, and has multiple earrings. This version of Obsidian wears a trenchcoat over a white shirt and tie and a mask resembling his post-Crisis costume, the only part of Obsidian's costume that carried over into the new continuity. Todd is locked up in an alternate version of Arkham Asylum but he leaves Arkham under the supervision of John Constantine, who hails from Prime Earth and is attempting to return home.

In the 2015 comics event Convergence, a two-part miniseries titled Infinity Inc. featured the return of the pre-Crisis on Infinite Earths version of the Infinity Inc. team, including Todd as Obsidian. Todd and Infinity Inc. were brought to Telos in the series. This Obsidian was based on his pre-Crisis version but had elements of the modern day version of the character as well. His counterparts made veiled references to Todd's sexuality and appeared accepting of him being in a relationship with a man.

DC Rebirth: Doomsday Clock and Dark Nights: Death Metal (2016–2021)
In the Watchmen sequel Doomsday Clock, Obsidian was seen with the Justice Society when Doctor Manhattan undoes the experiment that erased the Justice Society and the Legion of Super-Heroes.

Following the reboot of the multiverse at the end of Dark Nights: Death Metal, Alan Scott reunites with Jade and Obsidian at the Justice Society brownstone and comes out as gay.

Infinite Frontier (2021–present)

Powers and abilities
 Unlike his sister Jade, whose powers resemble their father's, Obsidian has various shadow-based powers from his father's exposure to shadow energy after a battle with Ian Karkull. Obsidian is connected to the Shadowlands, a dimension of primordial, quasi-sentient darkness. At will, Obsidian can merge with his own shadow and possess the shadows of others. In his shadow form, he is stronger than in human form, can pass through solid objects and can fly. After being corrupted by the Shadowlands, Obsidian was able to control his shadow powers to the point that he could grow to enormous size and create objects out of shadow, in a similar way that his father and sister can create objects out of green energy.
 Obsidian also has limited telepathic abilities and can force a person to see the evil side of their own soul, which has been known to drive people insane.
 During Crisis on Infinite Earths, Obsidian learned that in his shadow form he is resistant to low amounts of antimatter, for instance the amount of antimatter a shadow demon is made of. In his shadow form, shadow demons cannot hurt him, but he can hurt them.
 It is unknown what effects Obsidian's connection to the Shadowlands will have on his aging process. Others connected to it, like the Shade, have displayed immortality, while residual Shadowlands energy slowed the aging of the original JSA members.
 Manhunter #31 shows Obsidian being a skilled helicopter pilot.

Other versions
In the final issue of 52, a new multiverse is revealed, originally consisting of 52 identical realities.  Among the parallel realities shown is one designated "Earth-2". As a result of Mister Mind "eating" aspects of this reality, it takes on visual aspects similar to the pre-Crisis Earth-2, including Obsidian among other Justice Society of America characters.  The names of the characters and the team are not mentioned in the panel in which they appear.

In the 1997 Tangent Comics one-shot The Flash Todd Rice appeared as the character Dark Star, with the power to absorb light energy, but after a misunderstanding of a command from Francis Powell, Black Lightning he accidentally absorbs himself and therefore ceases to exist.

On the new Earth-9, a female version of Obsidian that can transform herself into stone exists.

Kingdom Come features Obsidian as one of Batman's rogue "Outsiders" team. He resembles The Shadow in appearance.

Sexual orientation
He has a short-lived, troubled relationship with Marcie Cooper, the third Harlequin, shortly before the disbanding of Infinity, Inc. Later, sexual confusion was shown during his tenure in the Justice League, when he told his friend Nuklon that the only two people he could ever love in the world were his sister and him. When Nuklon asked if he was gay, Obsidian did not fully answer, instead asking "Why must there be labels?" After Obsidian's redemption, JSA penciller Steven Sadowski stated that Todd's sexuality would be dealt with whenever he returned to that title.

Todd appeared in Manhunter (vol. 3) #18 where he shares a kiss with Damon Matthews, a recurring gay character, and spoke in the fashion of a lover, confirming his sexuality. Marc Andreyko, the writer of Manhunter, goes into detail about selecting Obsidian as Damon's lover:
I didn't want to make a character gay unless it felt organic. So, the list was pretty short. Then I remembered when Obsidian was in the JLA years ago and Gerard Jones, the writer, danced around the issue. I went back and read all my Infinity, Inc.'s and although Todd dated women, it was always a mess.

Andreyko said that DC was supportive, wanting a "visible gay character" and that it was "a general void in the DCU that needed exploration". Geoff Johns, longtime writer of JSA, also stated his support for the idea.

When writer Bill Willingham took over the JSA title, there was a great amount of concern among fans about how this would affect Todd (as Willingham is a Republican). Some fans even feared that Willingham would "cure" Todd's sexuality. In Justice Society of America (vol. 3) #40, Willingham attempted to address this concern in a humorous way by having the newly restored Obsidian announce that his homosexuality has been cured, only for him to quickly renounce this claim, telling the readers, while breaking the fourth wall for a brief moment, that he was only joking and that he was still gay.

As of Justice Society of America (vol. 3) #43 (October 2010), Todd is still dating Damon, confirming this in conversation with his father.

During the crossover Convergence Infinity Inc., Obsidian's sexuality is referenced. His teammates are okay if he is gay, but he denies it even though he brought a close male friend to his sister's theatre performance.

Rogues gallery
The following are enemies of Obsidian:

 Ian Karkull: A former foe of the All-Star Squadron and the Justice Society of America. Having been believed to be dead for decades, Ian manipulated Obsidian to gain access to, and subsequently rule, the shadow lands. Karkull had apparently been corrupting Obsidian for months in an effort to get revenge on his enemies in the Justice Society.
 Chroma: A cosmic entity that Obsidian faced during his time with Infinity, Inc. Chroma interrupted a televised concert with a song about apocalyptic events. The song, though talking about death, somehow proved so engaging that many people desired to hear it again and again. Todd, having just come off a bad date, found himself uninvolved with the song (thus making him immune to its effects).
 Kid Karnevil: While posing as a new JSA recruit, All-American Kid, Jeremy Karne attacked Obsidian with an illumination device. The attack left Todd in a severely degenerated state. Karne later stole the black egg that Obsidian had degenerated into and handed it over to his allies in the Fourth Reich.
 Harlequin: A former girlfriend of Todd's. She attempted to recruit him to the Manhunters, but he refused. Marcie was later responsible for the murder of Todd's leader and friend, Sylvester Pemberton.

In other media

Television
 Obsidian makes non-speaking cameo appearances in Justice League Unlimited as part of the expanded Justice League.
 Obsidian appears in the second season of Legends of Tomorrow, portrayed by Dan Payne as a young man and by Lance Henriksen as an older man. This version is a member of the Justice Society of America, who were primarily active in 1942. As of 1987, he became the last living member of the JSA after most of them were presumed dead while on a mission years prior.
 Todd Rice appears in season three of Stargirl, portrayed by Tim Gabriel. After being separated from his sister Jennie-Lynn Scott, he was taken in by the Helix Institute for Youth Rehabilitation while looking for his sister. Additionally, their powers became connected to each other after her ring, which she inherited from Alan Scott, was infected by dark matter residue left over from her fight with Eclipso in season two. In season three, they eventually reunite and Rice gains control of his powers.

Toys
 The DCAU version of Obsidian received a Target-exclusive figure in the Justice League Unlimited tie-in toyline.
 In 2010, Mattel released a 6" figure of "Todd Rice" (as the name "Obsidian" was unavailable due to a rights issue) in the Walmart-exclusive Wave 14 of their DC Universe Classics line.

References

External links
 Gay League Profile
 Dcdatabaseproject profile
 Obsidian profile at the dcuguide

Characters created by Roy Thomas
Characters created by Jerry Ordway
Comics characters introduced in 1983
DC Comics American superheroes
DC Comics characters who are shapeshifters
DC Comics characters with superhuman strength
DC Comics LGBT superheroes
DC Comics male superheroes
DC Comics metahumans
DC Comics characters who have mental powers
DC Comics telepaths
Earth-Two
Fictional avatars
Fictional characters from Milwaukee
Fictional characters who can change size
Fictional characters who can turn intangible
Fictional characters who can manipulate darkness or shadows
Fictional gay males
Twin characters in comics
Green Lantern characters
Superheroes who are adopted